Daria Pavlovna Sergaeva (born December 11, 2004, in Nizhny Novgorod, Russia) is a Russian individual rhythmic gymnast. She is the Junior Rhythmic Gymnastics World champion of the ribbon apparatus (2019), and a three-time Russian Junior all-around medalist.

Personal life
She is the daughter of Tatiana Sergaeva, honored coach for Russia and coach of the Senior Group Team.

Career

Junior 
Sergaeva began training rhythmic gymnastics at the Nizhny Novgorod Regional Olympic Reserve, she is coached by her grandmother Natalia Borisovna Tishina, who is an honored rhythmic gymnastics coach for the Russian federation.

Sergaeva is a fan favorite along with Lala Kramarenko for fans of Russian Rhythmic Gymnastics . Sergaeva is known by fans for her groovy style of dancing, upbeat choice of music, her charismatic personality and facial expressions that show in her performances. She is famous for her Ghost Busters 2018-19 ribbon routine that impressed fans over social media with her fluidity and personality in the routine.

In 2017 season, Sergaeva won bronze in the all-around (tied with Anna Sokolova) at the 2017 Russian Junior Championships. At the Junior Grand Prix Marbella, Sergaeva finished 5th in the all-around and won silver in Team (RUS Team 2). She then competed at the Junior Grand Prix Brno finishing 4th in the all-around. In October 12–14, Sergaeva won silver in the all-around at the "2017 Hope of Russia". On November 4–6, Sergaeva competed at the annual "Russian-Chinese Youth Games" where she won silver in all-around behind Lala Kramarenko.

In both 2018 & 2019, Sergaeva improved on her 2017 result by winning silver at the Russian Junior Championships behind Lala Kramarenko in the All-around 

In July 2019, Sergaeva won the ribbon event gold medal for the 1st Junior World Championships in Moscow, Russia. Her iconic “Ghost Busters” routine put her in first place despite rolling her ankle during the routine.

Senior 
In February 2020, Sergaeva debuted as a Senior at the International Tournament in Moscow, Russia and took part in the All Around scoring a total of (Hoop: 22.500, Ball: 20.300, Clubs: 21.350, Ribbon: 19.700) 83.850. In March, Sergaeva took part in the All Around Russian Championships (Nationals).

In 2021, Sergaeva won gold in the All Around for the International Rhythmic Gymnastics Tournament (IRGT) in Moscow, Russia (Hoop: 26.100, Ball: 25.300, Clubs: 25.250, Ribbon: 20.850) with a total of 97.500, she has improved significantly since last year. In March, Sergaeva took part in the All Around Russian Championships and scored 95.850, placing 8th.

Routine music information

Sergaeva is known for her upbeat choice of music. Most famously her 2018-19 ribbon routine- Ghost Busters.

Competitive highlights

References

External links
 
 Dariia Sergaeva profile 
 Dariia Sergaeva vk fanpage 
 

Russian rhythmic gymnasts
2004 births
Living people
Sportspeople from Nizhny Novgorod
Medalists at the Junior World Rhythmic Gymnastics Championships